Alesia Holliday is an American author who writes under own name as well as the pseudonyms Alyssa Day and Jax Abbott.  She won a RITA Award, given by the Romance Writers of America for excellence in romantic fiction.

Early life and education 

Alesia Marie Holliday was raised in Barnesville, Ohio, and graduated from Barnesville High School in 1981. She earned degrees from Ohio State University and Capital University Law School (J.D., 1995).

Writing career 

While working as a trial lawyer, she began writing.  In 2003, Holliday published a memoir, eMail to the Front, of her correspondence with her husband while he was deployed with the United States Navy.

Her first novel, a chick lit book called American Idle, was published in 2004.  The book launched Dorchester's making It imprint. Publishers Weekly described it as "zany" and "humorous."  Holliday says that her fiction writing style influenced her legal briefs, with one judge telling her "‘I love when you come before me, because your briefs are always so entertaining'".  To the surprise of her law colleagues, who considered her writing a hobby, Holliday soon quit law to write full-time.

Holliday writes in multiple genres using multiple pseudonyms.  Under her own name, she has written romantic comedies and mysteries.  As Jax Abbott, she writes YA novels.  As Alyssa Day, she writes paranormal romance.

Bibliography

Writing as Alesia Holliday

Contemporary romance 

 American Idle (also in Spring Fling)
 Santa Baby
 The Naked Truth About Guys 
 7 Ways To Lose Your Lover
 Blondes Have More Felons

Writing as Jax Abbott

Teen novels 

 Super Hero Prom
 Super Hero Sweet 16

Writing as Lucy Connors 
Author is no longer using the pseudonym Lucy Connors

Teen novels 

 The Lonesome Young

Writing as Alyssa Day

Non fiction 

 E-Mail To The Front

Poseidon's Warriors series

Warriors of Poseidon series 
Related to Poseidon's Warriors

Cardinal Witches series 

 Alejandro's Sorceress (also in Dark and Deadly)
 William's Witch (also in Taming The Vampire Anthology)
 Damon's Enchantress
 Jake's Djinn (also in Second Chances)

Tiger's Eye Mysteries series 
Author estimates this series will include 12 books

League of the Black Swan series

Vampire Motorcycle Club 

 Bane's Choice

Anthologies and collections

Personal 

Holliday's first two marriages were brief, ending in divorce. She was married to Michael D. Melching from June 16, 1985 to February 6, 1987. Holliday married Patrick R. Tourne on April 20, 1990 and they were divorced on December 8, 1994.

Holliday married her third husband Judson E. "Judd" McLevey II, a naval flight officer, on March 23, 1996. They have two children.

References

External links

Living people
Year of birth missing (living people)
People from Barnesville, Ohio
Ohio State University alumni
Capital University Law School alumni
RITA Award winners
Pseudonymous women writers
21st-century American novelists
21st-century American women writers
Novelists from Ohio
21st-century pseudonymous writers